The City of Richmond was a local government area about  east of Melbourne, the state capital of Victoria, Australia.

History

Richmond was incorporated as a municipality on 24 April 1855, having split from the City of Melbourne on the same day as the neighbouring City of Collingwood. It became a town on 28 September 1872, and a city on 17 February 1882.

In 1920, it became the first municipal council in Australia to have a female councillor, when Mary Catherine Rogers of the Labor Party was elected.

The Richmond council was sacked in 1982 by the State Government following a report which revealed allegations of electoral malpractice and fraud. The council was replaced by a state-appointed commissioner, Alex Gillon, to administer the city in its stead until an elected council was restored in 1988.

On 22 June 1994, the City of Richmond was abolished, and along with the Cities of Collingwood and Fitzroy, and parts of Fairfield and Alphington from the City of Northcote, was merged into the newly created City of Yarra.

Richmond was at one stage divided into wards, but by 1994 the council was represented by nine councillors, each representing all electors in the city. Meetings were held at the Richmond Town Hall, on Bridge Road, Richmond.

Mayors

Suburbs
 Burnley
 Cremorne
 Richmond*

* Council seat.

Population

* Estimate in the 1958 Victorian Year Book.

References

External links
 Victorian Places - Richmond

Richmond
City of Yarra
1855 establishments in Australia
1994 disestablishments in Australia